Camp Liberty is a former United States military installation in Baghdad, Iraq. The installation was used from 2012 to September 2016 to house members of the People's Mujahedin of Iran (PMOI, also called MEK), who had been forcibly evicted from Camp Ashraf.

History

U.S. Army base

Camp Liberty first came into existence during the 2003 U.S. invasion of Iraq as Camp Victory North, and was renamed (its Arabic translation is "Mukhayam Al-Nasr") in mid-September 2004 to its later name of Camp Liberty (in Arabic "Mukhayam Al Hurriya"). Other camps that made up the Victory Base Complex include Camp Victory (formerly known as Camp Victory South), Camp Striker, Logistics Base Seitz, and Camp Slayer. The renaming was part of an effort to give U.S. facilities around Baghdad friendlier connotations, and an attempt to resolve the issue of constantly changing facility names.

During the Iraq War, following the American invasion, the base was a large Coalition military installation located northeast of the Baghdad International Airport (BIAP), becoming part of the U.S. military's Victory Base Complex (VBC). Camp Liberty was twice the size of Camp Bondsteel in Kosovo, and one of the largest U.S. overseas posts built since the Vietnam War.

Camp Liberty killings

On 11 May 2009, an American soldier, U.S. Army Sergeant John M. Russell, opened fire on his fellow service members within the camp at a counseling clinic center, killing five before being subdued and taken into custody.

Forcible eviction of PMOI residents from Camp Ashraf to Camp Liberty
Under strong pressure by the Iraqi government, whose declared will is to expel the People's Mujahedin of Iran (PMOI/MEK) from Iraq, but who was aided as well by the United Nations Assistance Mission for Iraq (UNAMI) under the pretext to preserve their security, near all of the 3,400 MEK residents of Camp Ashraf were forcedly moved to Camp Liberty in 2012. This helped partly to convince the United States removing the MEK from its list of designated terrorist groups. 166 of the MEK members are wanted for committing acts of terrorism inside Iran and the Iranian government is seeking their extradition.

The Working Group on Arbitrary Detention of the UN Human Rights Council has categorized, in his Opinion of May 2012, the status of the MEK residents in Camp Liberty/Camp Hurriya as Arbitrary detention and called the Iraqi government for the "immediate release and lifting of all restraints upon the free movements of these persons". It reiterated and extended this vote in his Opinion of August 2012, additionally considering it "appropriate to refer the allegations concerning conditions in Camp Ashraf and Camp Liberty to the relevant human rights mechanisms for appropriate action".

2013 rocket attacks
A rocket and mortar attack left at least eight dead and nearly 100 wounded occurred at Camp Hurriya on 9 February 2013. Iranian residents of Camp Liberty and their representatives and lawyers appealed to the UN Secretary-General and U.S. officials to let them return to Ashraf, which they say is 80 times larger than Liberty and has concrete buildings and shelters that offer more protection. They argue that this move is all the more imperative because according to the UN Refugee Agency and the US embassy in Baghdad, resettlement will take anywhere from three to 10 years. So, the residents would be at risk of further attacks and the move to Ashraf would not hinder their resettlement. The United States has been working with the UN High Commissioner for Refugees (UNHCR) on the resettlement project.

On 20 April 2013, 20 explosions hit Camp Liberty/Camp Hurriya. Its residents accuse the Iraqi government of failing to offer adequate protection or medical care.

A deadly rocket attack occurred on 26 December 2013, killing four Iranian dissidents and wounding about seventy. This was the last of a total of four rocket attacks to Camp Liberty in 2013. The destructive power of 26 December attack was particularly high, as in addition to previously used rockets, missiles hit the camp with had about 10 times explosive power. Iraqi authorities have repeatedly denied involvement in attacks on the group. However, in a rare claim of responsibility for attacks on the MEK, Wathiq al-Batat, commander of the al-Mukhtar Army militia, admitted his group had fired rockets at the camp. This army is a relatively new Shi'ite militia, which has said it is supported and funded by Iran. Batat is a former leader of the more well-known Kata'ib Hezbollah militia.

The UNHCR called on the government of Iraq to urgently scale up security measures in the camp to ensure the safety and security of its residents. UNHCR urgently reiterated the need to find solutions for the camp's residents, and appealed  to countries to find places for 1,400 persons from Camp Liberty that had been submitted for relocation since 2011, stating that only 311 residents were secured to third countries so far.

October 2015 attack
The National Council of Resistance of Iran informed and warned on activities in Iraq by Iranian Quds Force, led by Qasem Soleimani, aimed to massacre Camp Liberty residents via a joint operation with Iraqi forces. In August 2014, the Iraqi government started to block food, fuel and water supplies. Former UNAMI chief Ad Melkert, who, in fall 2009, had strived to find a mediated solution for residents to remain protected in their original home city Camp Ashraf, appealed to UNAMI to hold the Iraqi government accountable for creating the descent conditions in Liberty and for blockading the delivery of daily life essentials. In October 2014, the Committee on Political Affairs and Democracy of the Parliamentary Assembly of the Council of Europe reiterated its concern over the situation, namely over a recent statement of the Iraqi Minister of Justice, in which he said that if Iran asked for the extradition of the residents of Camp Liberty, Iraq would deliver them.

In December 2014, UNHCR informed that it has been working since February 2012 to identify "individuals with international protection needs" and to find solutions outside Iraq for the remaining population of still 2,746 individuals.
On 30 January 2015, 100 Members of the Parliamentary Assembly of the Council of Europe in a written declaration urged Europe, USA, and UN that "Camp Liberty, home to Iranian exiles in Iraq, be recognized as refugee camp under supervision of UNHCR and specially medical and fuel siege be ended."

On the evening of 29 October 2015, another heavy rocket attack killed more than 20 residents in the camp. As with regard to many past attacks to Camp Liberty and Camp Ashraf, evidence points to Iran paramilitary forces being the perpetrators. UNHCR strongly condemned the attacks and stated that the residents are entitled to protection against expulsion or forced movement to any place where their lives or freedom would be threatened, and informed that it has supported the relocation of more than 900 residents to safe third countries since 2011; as however, approximately 2,160 people still remain, UNHCR renewed its calls upon governments of other countries to find ways to offer long-term solutions. The European Iraqi Freedom Association (EIFA), led by Struan Stevenson, Chairman of the European Parliament's Delegation for Relations with Iraq from 2009 to 2014, who was deeply involved in diplomacy aiming to safeguard the lives and human rights of the residents of Camp Ashraf, stated that to avoid further bloodshed just condemning the atrocity is not enough. EIFA urged the US to provide air cover for Camp Liberty, the UN to "stop any further obfuscation and officially recognise Camp Liberty as a refugee camp under its direct supervision and protection" and asked that the "international assistance to Iraq must be suspended forthwith until the security of the Camp Liberty residents is assured".

Relocation to Albania
UNHCR announced that, by the end of 2015, it has relocated more than one third of the residents, about 1100 persons, to third countries, affirming that this has been achieved with the cooperation and flexibility of the residents, in particular their commitment to meeting the bulk of the travel costs and living expenses; it also mentioned Albania's exceptional contribution who has received more than three-quarters of the relocated residents, and however renewed its appeal for help to all countries in light of the potential for more attacks to the still remaining 1970 persons. As a result of the efforts made by the National Council of Resistance of Iran in conjunction with an international political network, and the UNHCR, the relocation process was successfully concluded in September 2016 when the last remaining refugees left the camp for Albania.

Bibliography

See also
Iraq War order of battle 2009 for United States military in Iraq
Victory Fuel Point fuel thefts
Camp Ashraf
2013 Camp Ashraf massacre
List of United States Military installations in Iraq

References

External links 
Latest News Coverage on Camps Ashraf and Liberty (National Council of Resistance of Iran)

Liberty
Installations used by the People's Mojahedin Organization of Iran
Refugee camps in Iraq